For Lady (subtitled songs Billie Holiday made famous... an instrumental tribute to her great talents) is an album by the American jazz cornetist Webster Young. It contains tracks recorded in 1957 for the Prestige label.

Reception

AllMusic awarded the album 3 stars, with its review by Jim Todd stating: "While trumpeter Webster Young pays tribute to Billie Holiday on this, his only studio date as a leader, the set is equally a tribute to Young's musical role model, Miles Davis." All About Jazz praised the album's "sleepy sadness," writing that "Young's approach to the trumpet was relaxed and steady ... bucking the trend toward the poker-hot heat beginning to be exhibited by Lee Morgan and Freddie Hubbard."

Track listing
 "The Lady" (Webster Young)7:00     
 "God Bless the Child" (Billie Holiday, Arthur Herzog, Jr.)7:05     
 "Moanin' Low" (Howard Dietz, Ralph Rainger)7:42     
 "Good Morning Heartache" (Ervin Drake, Dan Fisher, Irene Higginbotham)8:54     
 "Don't Explain" (Holiday, Herzog)7:10     
 "Strange Fruit" (Abel Meeropol)4:18

Personnel 
Webster Youngcornet
Paul Quinichettetenor saxophone
Mal Waldronpiano
Joe Pumaguitar
Earl Maydouble bass
Ed Thigpendrums

References 

1957 albums
Albums produced by Bob Weinstock
Prestige Records albums
Albums recorded at Van Gelder Studio
Billie Holiday tribute albums